Harold Moses Love Jr. is a Democratic member of the Tennessee House of Representatives, for the 58th District.  He is the House Democratic assistant leader and Vice President of The National Black Caucus of State Legislators. Love's father, Harold Moses Love Sr., was a Nashville city councilman from 1962 to 1970 and a member of the Tennessee House of Representatives for the 54th District from 1968 to 1994.

Early life and education

Harold M. Love., Jr. was born  1972 in Nashville, Tennessee, to Rep. Harold M. Love, Sr. and Mary Y. Love. He is the youngest of five children and the only son. Love was educated in Metro Nashville Public Schools and graduated with honors from Whites Creek High School in 1990. He received his Bachelor's in economics and finance with a minor in political science in 1998 from Tennessee State University, a master's degree in theological studies from Vanderbilt University School of Divinity in 1994 and a Ph.D. in public policy and administration from Tennessee State University in 2017. While in undergraduate school, he marched in the Aristocrat of Bands and is a member of Rho Psi chapter of Omega Psi Phi fraternity.

Career

Love began serving in the Tennessee House of Representatives for the 58th District in 2012. He serves on the following House Committees: Education, State Government, Consumer and human resources. In addition he serves on the Tennessee Advisory Commission for Intergovernmental Relations(TACIR) and the Tennessee Second Look Commission.

Love was ordained by the African Methodist Episcopal Church (A.M.E.) Church in 1999 and was assigned to Pastor Hopewell A.M.E. Church in Columbia, Tennessee. From October 2002 to November 2016, he was the pastor of St. Paul A.M.E. Church in Nashville, Tennessee, and in 2015 was also the Presiding Elder of the South Nashville District of the A.M.E. Church. On November 21, 2016, he was appointed pastor of Lee Chapel A.M.E. Church in Nashville, Tennessee.

Personal life
Love is married to the former Leah Dupree, who is an attorney and serves as the government affairs officer at Tennessee State University. The couple resides in North Nashville

References

External links
Legislative website

Twitter
Instagram
Ballotpedia Profile

Living people
1972 births
Democratic Party members of the Tennessee House of Representatives
Politicians from Nashville, Tennessee
Tennessee State University alumni
Vanderbilt University alumni
21st-century American politicians